Ashleigh Barty and Casey Dellacqua were the defending champions, but Dellacqua retired from professional tennis in February 2018, and Barty decided not to participate.

Mihaela Buzărnescu and Raluca Olaru won the title, defeating Nadiia Kichenok and Anastasia Rodionova in the final, 7–5, 7–5.

Seeds

Draw

Draw

References
Main Draw

Internationaux de Strasbourg - Doubles
2018 Doubles
2018 in French tennis